Bariga Sugar is a 2017 Nollywood short film. The movie tells a story about relations between two friends in a brothel and how they are able to manage circumstances that comes their way.

Cast
Tina Mba
Lucy Ameh
Greg 'Teddy Bear' Ojefua
Tunde Azeez
Blessing Samuel
Halima Olarewaju

References

External links
 

2017 films
Nigerian drama films